MRCC — acronym, may refer to:
 ICAO code for Coto 47 Airport (Costa Rica)
 Maritime Rescue Coordination Centre, for example:
 Hong Kong MRCC
 Mumbai MRCC
 Medical Representatives Certification Commission
 Member of the Royal College of Chiropractors, see List of post-nominal letters (United Kingdom)
 Midwest Regional Climate Center
 Mildura Rural City Council
 Mission Regional Chamber of Commerce
 Mobile Reconnaissance and Command Center, see for example PPRU-1
 Multi-Reference Coupled Cluster
 Multi-Role Combatant Craft, see Wet sub
 Mumbai Regional Congress Committee

mRCC — Metastatic renal cell carcinoma